A , also called a  or , is a private collection of waka poems compiled by the author of the poems included.

List of kashū 

Kakinomoto no Ason Hitomaro Kashū (before 759)
Saigū no Nyōgo Shū (after 985)
Okikaze-shū (after the tenth century)
Sankashū (c. 1180)
Kojijū-shū (c. 1181)
Nijōin no Sanuki Shū (c. 1182)

References

Bibliography 
 
McMillan, Peter. 2010 (1st ed. 2008). One Hundred Poets, One Poem Each. New York: Columbia University Press.

External links 

Japanese literary terminology
Japanese literature
Japanese poetry
Articles containing Japanese poems
Stanzaic form

Kashū